Michael John Standish is a British production designer and set decorator. Best known for his work as set decorator in 2016 The Danish Girl, which earned him his first Academy Award for Best Production Design nomination at 88th Academy Awards along with British production designer Eve Stewart.

Filmography

As a production designer
 2012: Zero Dark Thirty (production buyer)  
 2012: John Carter (assistant set decorator)  
 2011: Captain America: The First Avenger (assistant set decorator)  
 2010: The Debt (buyer: London)  
 2010: The Wolfman (assistant set decorator - as Mike Standish)  
 2008: City of Ember (assistant set decorator - as Michael John Standish)  
 2008: The Duchess (production buyer)  
 2005: The Honeymooners (lead person)  
 2004: De-Lovely (production buyer)  
 2002: Nicholas Nickleby (prop buyer)  
 2002: All or Nothing (production buyer - as Mike Standish)  
 2002: About a Boy (production buyer - as Mike Standish)  
 2001: Bridget Jones's Diary (set decorator/buyer: additional photography - as Mike Standish)  
 2000: New Year's Day (production buyer)  
 2000: Sorted (production buyer)  
 2000: Saving Grace (production buyer)  
 1999: Topsy-Turvy (production buyer - as Mike Standish)  
 1998: The Land Girls (assistant buyer)  
 1997: Metroland (buying assistant)

As a set decorator 
 2016: A Cure for Wellness
 2015: Victor Frankenstein  
 2015: The Danish Girl
 2014: Fleming 
 2006: United 93

Awards

 2015: Academy Award for Best Production Design for The Danish Girl - nominated (Shared with: Eve Stewart)
 2015: BFCAA Award for Best Art Direction for The Danish Girl - nominated (Shared with: Eve Stewart)

See also

 List of English Academy Award nominees and winners

References

External links

British film designers
British art directors
Living people
Year of birth missing (living people)